Luis Miguel García-Marquina (born 28 July 1979) is a Spanish Para-cyclist who represented Spain at the 2020 Summer Paralympics.

Career
García-Marquina represented Spain in the men's time trial H3 event at the 2020 Summer Paralympics and won a bronze medal.

References

1979 births
Living people
Sportspeople from Jerez de la Frontera
Spanish male cyclists
Cyclists at the 2020 Summer Paralympics
Medalists at the 2020 Summer Paralympics
Paralympic medalists in cycling
Paralympic bronze medalists for Spain
Cyclists from Andalusia
21st-century Spanish people